Ogiame Atuwatse III (born 2 April 1984) is a Nigerian traditional king, paramount ruler of the Kingdom of Warri, and the 21st Olu of Warri. He was born Utieyinoritsetsola Emiko, also known as Tsola Emiko on 2 April 1984 to Olu Atuwatse II, the 19th Olu of Warri and Gladys Durorike Emiko in Warri. He is also a descendant of Olu Akengbuwa.

He was crowned the 21st Olu of Warri on Saturday 21 August 2021 at Ode-Itsekiri succeeding his uncle, Ogiame Ikenwoli I the 20th Olu of Warri.

Early life

Ogiame Atuwatse III, born Utieyinoritsetsola Emiko, commonly known as "Oritsetsola" or "Tsola" Emiko, was born on 2 April 1984 to then Prince Godwin Toritseju Emiko, and Gladys Durorike Emiko (née Okunade), in the capital of the Warri Kingdom, Warri, during the reign of his grandfather, the 18th Olu of Warri, Erejuwa II. His mother is a member of the Yoruba ethnic group and the daughter of Oba Sijuade Okunade, the Ooni of Ife. His paternal great-grandfather was Olu Ginuwa II, and he is the 16th great-grandson in a direct male line of Olu Ginuwa, the first Olu of Warri, and thus is a distant relative of the Benin Royal Family, through Ginuwa's grandfather, who was Oba Ewuare the Great of the Benin Empire.

Through his mother, he is a descendant of the Royal Dynasty of Oranmiyan, and the Ogboruu Royal House of Ile-Ife, one of the 4 ruling houses. He is a great-great grandson of Adelekan Olubuse I, the 46th Ooni of Ife, and is also thus a direct descendant of the progenitor of the Ogboruu royal house, Ooni Ogboruu, the 19th Ooni of Ife. Through Ogboruu, he is also a descendant of Ooni Lajodoogun, and his father, Ooni Lajamisan, and thus a direct descendant of the semi-legendary founders of the Yoruba people, Oranmiyan and Oduduwa. He is also descended from Oranmiyan in a direct male line through his father, via the first Oba of Benin, Eweka, who was a son of Oranmiyan, and an ancestor to Olu Ginuwa and Oba Ewuare.

His father rose to the throne as the 19th Olu of Warri, Olu Atuwatse II, when Tsola was 2 years old after the death of his grandfather.

Education and Career 
He attended NNPC Primary School in Warri and Adesoye College, Offa, Kwara State for his primary and secondary education respectively.  He obtained a bachelors degree in Art, majoring in International Studies and Political Science from Case Western Reserve University, Cleveland, Ohio, USA in 2006. In 2007, he obtained a Master’s of Science degree in Management from the same university’s Weatherhead School of Management. 

In 2008, Ogiame Atuwatse III returned to Nigeria for the mandatory National Youth Service Corps (NYSC) and served in the Public Affairs Department of National Petroleum Investment Management Services (NAPIMS).

After his NYSC, he worked as an officer at the Shell Nigeria Closed Pension Fund Administrator (SNCFPA) and Sahara Energy between 2010 and 2012 as a Government Relations Officer.

Ogiame Atuwatse III is a serial entrepreneur, he is the founder of Noble Nigeria Ltd. and Coral Curator Ltd. He is the Chairman of Ocean Marine Security Ltd. and a Director at Gulf of Guinea Ltd. and Vessellink Nig. Ltd.

Personal life 
He is married to Olori Ivie Atuwatse III, the daughter of late Nigerian businessman Hosa Wells Okunbo, since 2014. They have 3 children.

Controversy surrounding ascension to the throne 
The Ologbotsere of Warri, Chief Ayiri Emami who wished to follow the tradition on succession was resisted by the significant many Itsekiri sons and daughters in support of Prince Tsola Emiko's ascension to the throne despite his mother's Yoruba heritage as a 1979 edict stated that the mother of the Olu of Warri must have either Itsekiri or Benin origin. This led to the tussle amongst the palace chiefs but at the pronouncement of the death of Ikenwoli, Prince Tsola Emiko was declared the Olu-designate by the Iyatsere (second in command after the Ologbotsere) and this was met with celebration by many Itsekiris "The We Move Gang". Chief Ayiri Emami (The most ranked chief) however referred to the declaration as null.
A few days prior to the coronation of Prince Tsola Emiko, it was reported that the 400-year-old crown of the Olu of Warri was stolen. It was however noted that this occurrence could not hinder the proceedings as multiple crowns exist.

Awards 
In October 2022, a Nigerian national honor of Commander Of The Order Of The Fedral Republic (CFR) was conferred on him by President Muhammadu Buhari.

References 

Living people
1984 births
Nigerian traditional rulers
Itsekiri people
Case Western Reserve University alumni